Sam the Eagle may refer to:

 Sam Eagle, a Muppet character
 Sam (mascot), mascot of the 1984 Summer Olympics
 Sam the Eagle, the audio-animatronic master of ceremonies for the Disneyland attraction America Sings